Rainer Wieland (born 19 February 1957 in Stuttgart) is a German politician and member of the European Parliament for Germany. He is a member of the Christian Democratic Union, part of the European People's Party. He has been a member of the European Parliament since 1997 and one of its vice-presidents since 2009. His area of responsibility as a member of the European Parliament includes the Stuttgart administrative district. Since 2011, Wieland has been president of the non-partisan Europa-Union Deutschland (Union of European Federalists Germany).

Education and profession 
He studied law in Tübingen and Heidelberg and completed his legal clerkship in Stuttgart.

Rainer Wieland is a lawyer. He is founding partner of the law firm "Theumer, Wieland & Weisenburger" in Stuttgart, which was established in 1992. There he is responsible for European law and family law.

Family 
Rainer Wieland is married and has two children.

Party 
Wieland is a member of the conservative Christian Democratic Union, part of the European People's Party.

In the Young Christian Democrats Gerlingen, Wieland was local chaiman from 1975 to 1980 and chairman of the Young Christian Democrats Ludwigsburg from 1981 to 1983. From 1985 to 1988 he was deputy district chairman of the Young Christian Democrats Nord-Württemberg and from 1990 to 1992 deputy state chairman of the Young Christian Democrats Baden-Württemberg.

Wieland was a member of the CDU federal party committee from 1983 to 1991, and has been a member of the executive committee of the CDU Nord-Württemberg since 1991. He has been chairman of the CDU Ludwigsburg since 1993. Furthermore, he is member of the presidium of CDU Baden-Württemberg.

In terms of local politics, Rainer Wieland was a member of the municipal council of the city of Gerlingen from 1984 to 1998 and the district council of Ludwigsburg County from 1994 to 1998. He has been a member of the regional assembly of the Verband Region Stuttgart since 1994.

In the non-partisan regional section of UEF Baden-Württemberg, he was chairman from 2001 to 2013 and was a member of the ZDF Television Council as a representative of the UEF from 2006 to 2016. Since 2011, Wieland is President of Europa-Union Deutschland (UEF Germany). Complementary to his parliamentary work, Wieland is also a member of the non-partisan UEF Parliamentary Group European Parliament. From 2008 to 2011, Wieland was vice president of the European Movement International.

Member of the European Parliament
Wieland belongs since 1997 as a Member of the European Parliament of the CDU to the Group of the European People's Party (Christian Democrats), which represents the largest group in the European Parliament. Most recently, Rainer Wieland was again elected to the European Parliament in May 2019 from position 1 on the CDU state list of Baden-Württemberg.

As a member of parliament, Wieland has been responsible for the Stuttgart administrative district, including the state capital Stuttgart and the surrounding counties of  Böblingen, Esslingen, Göppingen, Heidenheim, Heilbronn, Ludwigsburg, Schwäbisch Hall, Hohenlohekreis, Main-Tauber-Kreis, Ostalbkreis and Rems-Murr-Kreis.

He is a member of the Committee on Constitutional Affairs and the Committee on Budgets. Wieland is a full member of the ACP–EU Joint Parliamentary Assembly (ACP-EU). He is a deputy in the Committee on Petitions and in the delegation for relations with Bosnia and Herzegovina and Kosovo. He is a member of the Kangaroo Group.

He is also chairman of the regional group of CDU deputies from Baden-Württemberg in the European Parliament and a member of the EPP Group's executive committee.

In January 2022, Wieland came under criticism when it became known that he had his workplace converted for almost 630,000 euros, according to an overview of the parliamentary administration. The modernization is said to have taken place as part of an "ideas laboratory" to test new office technology.

Vice President of the European Parliament 
Since 2009 Wieland has been one of the 14 Vice Presidents of the European Parliament, with special responsibility for buildings, budget, transport, environment-conscious Parliament, European Political Parties as well as relations with the French, Belgian and Luxembourg authorities on the seat and places of work of the Parliament. In this capacity, Wieland is a member of the Parliament´s Bureau of the European Parliament and replacing the President for Africa and the ACP (African, Caribbean and Pacific) group.

Honorary offices and memberships 
Wieland is a member of several local associations in his home country. In the Theaterhaus Stuttgart, he is Member of the Board of Trustees. Furthermore, he has been committed to the Balkan region for years, be it through visits on site or support for student exchanges with schools from Baden-Württemberg.

Awards and honors 
 2009: Federal Cross of Merit with ribbon
 2018: Honorary citizen of the Kosovar city of Drenas
 2021: Order of Merit of the State of Baden-Württemberg

References

1957 births
Living people
Politicians from Stuttgart
Christian Democratic Union of Germany MEPs
MEPs for Germany 2019–2024
MEPs for Germany 2014–2019
MEPs for Germany 2009–2014
MEPs for Germany 2004–2009
MEPs for Germany 1999–2004
Recipients of the Cross of the Order of Merit of the Federal Republic of Germany